Abhedananda Mahavidyalaya, established in 1965, is a government affiliated college located at Sainthia in the Birbhum district of West Bengal. It is affiliated to University of Burdwan and offers courses in arts, science and commerce.

History
Sri Sri Thakur Satyanandadev, the spiritual disciple of Swami Abhedananda founded the college under the affiliation of the University of Burdwan in the sacred memory of his spiritual guide. This college was established to cater the needs of higher education of the students of Sainthia and the vast rural areas.

Departments

Science

Chemistry
Physics
Mathematics
Zoology
Botany

Arts and Commerce

Bengali
English
Sanskrit
History
Geography
Political Science
Philosophy
Economics
Commerce

Accreditation
The college is recognized by the University Grants Commission (UGC).

See also

References

External links 
Abhedananda Mahavidyalaya

Colleges affiliated to University of Burdwan
Educational institutions established in 1965
Universities and colleges in Birbhum district
1965 establishments in West Bengal